The Philip K. Dick Award is an American science fiction award given annually at Norwescon and sponsored by the Philadelphia Science Fiction Society and (since 2005) the Philip K. Dick Trust.  Named after science fiction writer Philip K. Dick, it has been awarded since 1983, the year after his death.  It is awarded to the best original paperback published each year in the US.

The award was founded by Thomas Disch with assistance from David G. Hartwell, Paul S. Williams, and Charles N. Brown. As of 2016, it is administered by Pat LoBrutto, John Silbersack, and Gordon Van Gelder.  Past administrators include Algis Budrys, David G. Hartwell, and David Alexander Smith.

Winners and nominees 
Winners are listed in bold. 

Authors of special citation entries are listed in italics.  

The year in the table below indicates the year the book was published; winners are announced the following year.

References

External links
 
 List of all winning and nominated novels

Science fiction awards
Awards established in 1983
American literary awards
D
Philip K. Dick